Object-oriented design (OOD) is the process of planning a system of interacting objects for the purpose of solving a software problem. It is one approach to software design.

Overview
An object contains encapsulated data and procedures grouped together to represent an entity. The 'object interface' defines how the object can be interacted with. An object-oriented program is described by the interaction of these objects. Object-oriented design is the discipline of defining the objects and their interactions to solve a problem that was identified and documented during object-oriented analysis.

What follows is a description of the class-based subset of object-oriented design, which does not include object prototype-based approaches where objects are not typically obtained by instantiating classes but by cloning other (prototype) objects.
Object-oriented design is a method of design encompassing the process of object-oriented decomposition and a notation for depicting both logical and physical as well as state and dynamic models of the system under design.

Object-oriented design topics

Input (sources) for object-oriented design
The input for object-oriented design is provided by the output of object-oriented analysis. Realize that an output artifact does not need to be completely developed to serve as input of object-oriented design; analysis and design may occur in parallel, and in practice the results of one activity can feed the other in a short feedback cycle through an iterative process. Both analysis and design can be performed incrementally, and the artifacts can be continuously grown instead of completely developed in one shot.

Some typical input artifacts for object-oriented design are:

 Conceptual model: The result of object-oriented analysis, it captures concepts in the problem domain. The conceptual model is explicitly chosen to be independent of implementation details, such as concurrency or data storage.
 Use case: A description of sequences of events that, taken together, lead to a system doing something useful. Each use case provides one or more scenarios that convey how the system should interact with the users called actors to achieve a specific business goal or function. Use case actors may be end users or other systems. In many circumstances use cases are further elaborated into use case diagrams. Use case diagrams are used to identify the actor (users or other systems) and the processes they perform.
 System sequence diagram: A system sequence diagrams (SSD) is a picture that shows, for a particular scenario of a use case, the events that external actors generate, their order, and possible inter-system events.
 User interface documentations (if applicable): Document that shows and describes the look and feel of the end product's user interface. It is not mandatory to have this, but it helps to visualize the end-product and therefore helps the designer.
 Relational data model (if applicable): A data model is an abstract model that describes how data is represented and used. If an object database is not used, the relational data model should usually be created before the design, since the strategy chosen for object-relational mapping is an output of the OO design process. However, it is possible to develop the relational data model and the object-oriented design artifacts in parallel, and the growth of an artifact can stimulate the refinement of other artifacts.

Object-oriented concepts 
The five basic concepts of object-oriented design are the implementation level features that are built into the programming language.  These features are often referred to by these common names:

Object/Class: A tight coupling or association of data structures with the methods or functions that act on the data. This is called a class, or object (an object is created based on a class).  Each object serves a separate function.  It is defined by its properties, what it is and what it can do.  An object can be part of a class, which is a set of objects that are similar.
Information hiding: The ability to protect some components of the object from external entities. This is realized by language keywords to enable a variable to be declared as private or protected to the owning class.
Inheritance: The ability for a class to extend or override functionality of another class.  The so-called subclass has a whole section that is derived (inherited) from the superclass and then it has its own set of functions and data.
Interface (object-oriented programming): The ability to defer the implementation of a method. The ability to define the functions or methods signatures without implementing them.
Polymorphism (specifically, Subtyping): The ability to replace an object with its subobjects. The ability of an object-variable to contain, not only that object, but also all of its subobjects.

Designing concepts
 Defining objects mothers, creating class diagram from conceptual diagram: Usually map entity to class.
 Identifying attributes.
 Use design patterns (if applicable): A design pattern is not a finished design, it is a description of a solution to a common problem, in a context. The main advantage of using a design pattern is that it can be reused in multiple applications. It can also be thought of as a template for how to solve a problem that can be used in many different situations and/or applications.  Object-oriented design patterns typically show relationships and interactions between classes or objects, without specifying the final application classes or objects that are involved.
 Define application framework (if applicable): Application framework is usually a set of libraries or classes that are used to implement the standard structure of an application for a specific operating system. By bundling a large amount of reusable code into a framework, much time is saved for the developer, since he/she is saved the task of rewriting large amounts of standard code for each new application that is developed.
 Identify persistent objects/data (if applicable): Identify objects that have to last longer than a single runtime of the application. If a relational database is used, design the object relation mapping.
 Identify and define remote objects (if applicable).

Output (deliverables) of object-oriented design
 Sequence diagram - Extend the system sequence diagram to add specific objects that handle the system events.
 A sequence diagram shows, as parallel vertical lines, different processes or objects that live simultaneously, and, as horizontal arrows, the messages exchanged between them, in the order in which they occur.

 Class diagram -  A class diagram is a type of static structure UML diagram that describes the structure of a system by showing the system's classes, its attributes, and the relationships between the classes. The messages and classes identified through the development of the sequence diagrams can serve as input to the automatic generation of the global class diagram of the system.

Some design principles and strategies
 Dependency injection: The basic idea is that if an object depends upon having an instance of some other object then the needed object is "injected" into the dependent object; for example, being passed a database connection as an argument to the constructor instead of creating one internally.
 Acyclic dependencies principle:  The dependency graph of packages or components (the granularity depends on the scope of work for one developer) should have no cycles. This is also referred to as having a directed acyclic graph.  For example, package C depends on package B, which depends on package A. If package A also depended on package C, then you would have a cycle.
 Composite reuse principle: Favor polymorphic composition of objects over inheritance.

See also
 Class-responsibility-collaboration card
 GRASP (object-oriented design)
 SOLID
 IDEF4
 Object-oriented analysis
 Object-oriented programming

References

External links
Object-Oriented Analysis & Design - overview using UML
Larman, Craig. Applying UML and Patterns - Third Edition
Object-Oriented Analysis and Design
LePUS3 and Class-Z: formal modelling languages for object-oriented design

Software design
Object-oriented programming